Andrew Broaddus (May 15, 1900 – September 7, 1972) was Mayor of Louisville, Kentucky from December 1953 to December 1957.

Life
He was born and died in Louisville. After serving in the Navy during World War I he attended Centre College in nearby Danville, Kentucky, but did not graduate, leaving after two years in 1921 to work in his family's laundry business, becoming vice president of it by 1930.

He was elected to the Board of Aldermen in 1933 as a Democrat, and mayor in 1953. His administration is remembered for the Mallon Plan, a failed attempt to annex large portions of Jefferson County, which were beginning to develop quickly as suburbs of Louisville. He also signed an order officially ending racial segregation in Louisville's public parks and pools in 1955.

After his term as mayor, he served as chairman of the Urban Renewal Advisory Committee under mayor Bruce Hoblitzell, and city civil-defense director under Frank W. Burke starting in 1969. He died of a heart attack in 1972 and is buried in Cave Hill Cemetery.

The Mayor Andrew Broaddus a lifesaving station, is named in his honor.

External links
Mayor Andrew Broaddus, ex. Life-Saving Station No. 10 A former Coast Guard station named after Broaddus

1900 births
1972 deaths
Mayors of Louisville, Kentucky
Burials at Cave Hill Cemetery
20th-century American politicians